The Man the Worlds Rejected is a collection of science fiction stories by American writer Gordon R. Dickson.  It was first published by Tor Books in 1986.  Most of the stories originally appeared in the magazines Planet Stories, Analog Science Fiction and Fact, If, Fantastic Universe and Fantasy and Science Fiction.

Contents

 "The Man the Worlds Rejected"
 "Jackal’s Meal"
 "Minotaur"
 "Turnabout"
 "Strictly Confidential"
 "In Iron Years"
 "The Monster and the Maiden"
 "A Matter of Perspective"

References

1986 short story collections
Short story collections by Gordon R. Dickson
Tor Books books